Wergu Wetan Stadium is a multi-use stadium in Kudus, Indonesia.  It is currently used mostly for football matches and is used as the home venue for Persiku Kudus of the Liga Indonesia. The stadium has a capacity of 15,000 spectators.

References

External links
Stadium information

Buildings and structures in Central Java
Football venues in Indonesia